The 1940 Columbia Lions football team was an American football team that represented Columbia University during the 1945 college football season.  In their 11th season under head coach Lou Little, the team compiled a 5–2–2 record and outscored all opponents by a combined total of 81 to 72.

Schedule

References

Columbia
Columbia Lions football seasons
Columbia Lions football